Aurora kinase C, also Serine/threonine-protein kinase 13 is an enzyme that in humans is encoded by the AURKC gene.

Function 

This gene encodes a member of the highly conserved Aurora subfamily of serine/threonine protein kinases with two other members, Aurora A and Aurora B. The encoded protein is a chromosomal passenger protein that forms complexes with Aurora-B and inner centromere proteins and may play a role in organizing microtubules in relation to centrosome/spindle function during mitosis. This gene is overexpressed in several cancer cell lines, suggesting an involvement in oncogenic signal transduction. Alternative splicing results in multiple transcript variants.

Function 

Temporal expression patterns and subcellular localization of Aurora kinases in mitotic cells from G2 to cytokinesis indicate association with mitotic and meiotic structure. Although yeast contain only one Aurora kinase and C. elegans and Drosophila contain only two, mammals have three Aurora kinases with 67-76% homology that are structurally similar and localize similarly.

Aurora C localizes to the centrosome and then to the midzone of mitotic cells from anaphase to cytokinesis. It is expressed about an order of magnitude less than Aurora B in diploid human fibroblasts, with mRNA and protein concentrations peaking during the G2/M phase. Aurora C levels, however, peak after those of Aurora B later in the M phase. While Aurora A and B are expressed in mitotic somatic cells, Aurora C is more often expressed during meiosis (spermatogenesis and oogenesis).

Aurora B kinase regulates kinetochore maturation, destabilization of improper kinetochore-microtubule attachments, and spindle assembly checkpoint (SAC), central spindle organization, and cytokinesis. Aneuploidy results from independent and simultaneous inhibition of Aurora B and Aurora C. Slattery et al. found that they have overlapping functions and that Aurora C was able to rescue Aurora B-deficient mitotic cells from aneuploidy.

Clinical significance

Expression is typically limited to meiotic cells, but overexpression occurs in some cancer cell lines. PLZF, a transcription repressor, and its CpG island methylation are the most studied modes of regulating AURKC regulation. Although all of the Aurora kinases are overexpressed in many cancer cell lines, only Aurora A and C possess oncogenic activity, producing multinucleated cells and tumors in vivo when overexpressed. When cells overexpressing Aurora C were treated with nocodazole to turn on the SAC, Aurora B protein stability and activity decreased. This then prevented activation of SAC protein BubR1 and phosphorylation of histone H3 and MCAK.

Inactivating mutations of Aurora C have been shown to cause infertility in men characterized by macrocephalic and multiflagellular spermatozoa. Homozygous and heterozygous c.144delC mutation in the AURKC gene was found with an allelic frequency of 2.14% in Moroccan men with unexplained spermatogenic failure. The heterozygous state had a frequency of 1% in normospermic fertile men. Although c.144delC represents 85.5% of mutant alleles, the nonsense mutation p.Y248* (13% of all mutant alleles) is present in both European and African men and can lead to infertility. Klinefelter syndrome and Y chromosome microdeletion analyses are the most common genetic tests offered to infertile men, but AURKC and DPY19L2 defects are the leading cause of infertility in North African men.

Interactions 

Both Aurora B and C interact with the inner centromere protein (INCENP) from the C-terminal to the conserved IN box domain, but Aurora B preferentially binds INCENP. The chromosomal passenger complex (CPC), essential for chromosome segregation, contains the four subunits: the Aurora kinase, INCENP, survivin, and borealin (also known as dasra). Co-expression of Aurora B and C in vivo interferes with INCENP binding, localization, and stability.

References

Further reading

External links